Michael Drayer (born March 19, 1986) is an American actor. He is best known for his recurring role as Cisco on the television drama–thriller series Mr. Robot, Gabe on the television drama series Deception, and for his supporting role as Eddie in Sneaky Pete. Drayer also acted in Vinyl, The Sopranos, The Following, Aquarius, Timeless, and Louie. In addition to television work, he also appeared in The Wrestler, August Rush, and Before I Disappear.

Filmography

Film

Television

References

External links
 
 

Living people
1986 births
Male actors from New York City
American male film actors
American male television actors
People from Staten Island